Tidiane is a masculine given name. Notable people with the name include:

 Ahmed Tidiane Souaré (born 1951), Guinean politician
 Amadou Tidiane Tall (born 1975), Burkinabé footballer
 Cheick Tidiane Seck (born 1953), Malian musician
 Cheikh Tidiane Gadio (born 1956), Senegalese diplomat
 Sékou Tidiane Souare (born 1983), Ivorian footballer
 Tidiane Dia (born 1985), Senegalese footballer
 Tidiane Sane (born 1985), Senegalese footballer

Masculine given names